Sweett Group, formerly known as Cyril Sweett, is an international physical assets management consultancy. It is part of Currie & Brown.

History 
The firm was founded in 1928 by Cyril Sweett. The firm launched an initial public offering on the Alternative Investment Market under the name Cyril Sweett in 2007, raising £26m and valuing the business at £61m. The Group initially expanded throughout the UK and then internationally, with the acquisition of a number of cost management and project management firms, including Burns Bridge, an Australian-based project management firm, and in July 2010, Widnell, the biggest independent cost management firm in Asia. The organisation was rebranded as Sweett Group in July 2011, consolidating the Group's existing brands.

The firm was acquired by the Jersey-based Currie & Brown in August 2016. The firm's old web site redirects to Currie & Brown.

References

1928 establishments in England
Defunct companies based in London
Consulting firms established in 1928
Consulting firms disestablished in 2016
2016 disestablishments in England
British companies disestablished in 2016
British companies established in 1928